Penthus tenebrioides is a species of beetle in the family Carabidae, the only species in the genus Penthus.

References

Harpalinae
Beetles described in 1838